The Berlin-Spandau Ship Canal, or Berlin-Spandauer Schifffahrtskanal in German, is a  canal in Berlin, Germany. It was built between 1848 and 1859 to a plan created by Peter Joseph Lenné, and was formerly known as the Hohenzollern Canal or Hohenzollernkanal. 

Because it joins the River Havel upstream of the river lock at Spandau, it provides a more direct route from the River Spree to the Oder–Havel Canal.

The Westhafen Canal and Charlottenburg Canal also connect the port to the River Spree further downstream in Charlottenburg.

On August 26, 2013, author Wolfgang Herrndorf committed suicide by gunshot to the head on the banks of the canal following a long illness.

Gallery

References

Canals in Berlin
Buildings and structures in Charlottenburg-Wilmersdorf
Buildings and structures in Mitte
Buildings and structures in Spandau
Federal waterways in Germany
Canals opened in 1859
CBerlinSpandau